Micheál Aodh Martin (born 1994) is an Irish Gaelic footballer who plays for Cork Championship club Nemo Rangers and at senior level for the Cork county team. He usually lines out as a goalkeeper. He is the son of Micheál Martin, Ireland's fifteenth Taoiseach.

Career
Martin first came to prominence as a Gaelic footballer with the Nemo Rangers club, beginning at juvenile and underage levels before progressing onto the club's senior team. He lined out in goal when the club were beaten by Corofin in the 2018 All-Ireland club final, while he has also won four Cork PSFC titles, including one as team captain in 2020. Martin first appeared on the inter-county scene as a member of the Cork minor football team in 2012 before later winning a Munster Championship title with the under-21 team. He made his Cork senior football team debut in the 2015 National League.

Career statistics

Honours
Nemo Rangers
Munster Senior Club Football Championship: 2017, 2019
Cork Premier Senior Football Championship: 2015, 2017, 2019, 2020 (c)

Cork
Munster Under-21 Football Championship: 2014

References

External link
Micheál Martin profile at the Cork GAA website

1994 births
Living people
Children of Taoisigh
Cork inter-county Gaelic footballers
Gaelic football goalkeepers
Aodh
Nemo Rangers Gaelic footballers
UCC Gaelic footballers